Peter John Boxall  is a former senior Australian public servant and policymaker.

Background and early life
Peter Boxall was brought up on a farm in Victoria. From year nine, he went to boarding school at Ballarat Grammar. He attained a Master of Economics from the Australian National University in 1973.

Career
Boxall spent seven years working at the International Monetary Fund in the United States. He then chose to study for his doctorate at the University of Chicago with supervision from Gary Becker, Robert Lucas and Sherwin Rosen.

On returning to Australia in 1986, Boxall joined the Department of the Treasury in the Australian Public Service. He took leave from work in the public sector to work as Chief of staff to Peter Costello, Deputy leader of the Liberal Party of Australia in the late 1980s and early 1990s.

Boxall returned to the Australian Public Service in 1997, having been appointed Secretary of the Department of Finance. He stayed with the finance department as it transitioned to become the Department of Finance and Administration. While head of the Finance Department, Boxall was known as being at the forefront of outsourcing services from the public service, including for IT. He also oversaw efforts to engage the private sector to manage the Department's $2.5 billion property portfolio, with the aim to tap into a strategic partnership as an avenue for resources and expertise.

In 2001 he was appointed Secretary of the Department of Employment and Workplace Relations (DEWR), an organisation with over 3000 staff. During his time at DEWR he was involved in implementing the Howard Government's controversial WorkChoices policies. He stayed at DEWR until December 2007 when he was appointed head of the Department of Resources, Energy and Tourism.

Boxall worked as a commissioner Australian Securities and Investments Commission between January 2009 and November 2011, leaving to take up a job in the NSW Government as Chairman of the Independent Pricing and Regulatory Tribunal.

In 2013 and 2014, he was a member of the Abbott Government's National Commission of Audit, which was established to improve the Australian government's budget.

Awards
Boxall was named an Officer of the Order of Australia in 2007 for service to economic and financial policy development and reform in the areas of accrual budgeting, taxation and workplace relations.

Notes

References and further reading

Date of birth missing (living people)
Australian public servants
Living people
Australian National University alumni
University of Chicago alumni
Officers of the Order of Australia
Secretaries of the Australian Department of Finance
Year of birth missing (living people)